Gilles De Oliveira (born October 30, 1984 in Brétigny-sur-Orge) is a French professional football player. Currently, he plays in the Championnat de France amateur for AS Yzeure.

He played on the professional level in Ligue 2 for Troyes AC.

1984 births
Living people
French footballers
Ligue 2 players
ES Troyes AC players
Moulins Yzeure Foot players
Montluçon Football players
Association football defenders